Cierpice may refer to the following places in Poland:
Cierpice, Lower Silesian Voivodeship (south-west Poland)
Cierpice, Kuyavian-Pomeranian Voivodeship (north-central Poland)